Wilbert "Peter" Jackson (4 August 1905 – 9 May 1986) was an English football player and manager. He played for Southend United and Stoke City and managed Bradford City and Wrexham. His twin sons Peter and David were also professional footballers. Both played under their father at Wrexham and Bradford City.

Playing career
Born in Luddendenfoot, Halifax, Jackson started his career in local football his hometown club and then Hebden Bridge before joining Football League side Stoke City in 1924. He became a very useful back-up player in Tom Mather's but could only manage a few matches consecutively as he suffered with leg spasms. As a result, he averaged around ten games per season but he did play in 22 matches in 1930–31. In total Jackson spent ten seasons at the Victoria Ground making 74 appearances scoring once which came in a 3–1 win over Southampton on 25 March 1933. In 1934, he moved to Southend United but after just three games he returned to the Stoke City in the role as assistant manager.

Managerial career
Jackson's return to the Victoria Ground was as assistant manager to the club's new manager Bob McGrory in 1935, a position he held until 1939. In November 1950, he took his first full managerial role at Wrexham. He made history by giving debuts to his twin sons Peter and David.

Jackson Senior moved to Bradford City in February 1955 after Ivor Powell was sacked. Both his sons followed him from Wales to West Yorkshire. City were forced to apply for re-election in Jackson's first season following a poor run of form under Powell. Jackson's first full season saw the team come 8th in Third Division (North) followed by a 9th-place finish in 1956–57. In 1957–58 the club recorded its best post-war position by coming third. He was asked to manage the Third Division North representative team in October 1957.

The leagues were re-organised the following season and City's positions dropped to 11th and 19th in Division Three before the club were relegated in 1960–61. Jackson left the club in March 1961. His two sons left with him. Peter Junior had played 199 league games, and David 250 scoring 61 goals. The pair moved to Tranmere Rovers.

Jackson Senior returned to Stoke City as a scout. In March 1969 he moved back to Bradford again as a scout.

Career statistics

Player
Source:

Manager

Honours
 Stoke City
 Football League Third Division North champions: 1926–27
 Football League Second Division champions: 1932–33

References

External links
 

1905 births
1986 deaths
Footballers from Halifax, West Yorkshire
Stoke City F.C. players
Southend United F.C. players
Wrexham A.F.C. managers
Bradford City A.F.C. managers
English football managers
English Football League players
English footballers
Association football wing halves